William Oswald (3 August 1900 – 24 May 1969) was a Scottish footballer who played professionally in Scotland, England and the United States. He played as a forward.

Life and career
Oswald was born in Dundee, Scotland, in 1900. He played football for Dundee Celtic, and had trials with English club Gillingham and with Dundee Hibs, during which he scored twice in a 4–1 win against Armadale at the end of the 1921–22 Scottish Division Two season. He chose to turn professional with Gillingham, and contributed 3 goals from 13 appearances in the 1922–23 Third Division South before returning to Scotland.

He spent the 1923–24 season with St Johnstone, mainly in the reserves, and then joined Dundee United in August 1924, initially on a month's trial. He top-scored with 12 goals, 10 in the league, as Dundee United won the 1924–25 Division Two title, but was less prolific in the First Division, and returned to England at the end of the season with another Third Division South club, Brighton & Hove Albion. He stayed with Albion for two seasons, but was unable to displace either Jack Nightingale or his former Dundee United teammate Tommy Simpson from the starting eleven, and scored twice from just 14 appearances.

In 1928, Oswald joined Providence of the American Soccer League. He briefly played for Fall River and the New York Yankees in 1931. He remained in the United States, settling in Providence, Rhode Island, where he became a naturalized citizen in 1944 and died in May 1969.

References

1900 births
1969 deaths
Footballers from Dundee
Scottish footballers
Association football forwards
Dundee United F.C. players
Gillingham F.C. players
St Johnstone F.C. players
Brighton & Hove Albion F.C. players
Fall River F.C. players
New York Yankees (soccer) players
Scottish Football League players
English Football League players
American Soccer League (1921–1933) players
Scottish expatriate footballers
Scottish emigrants to the United States
Naturalized citizens of the United States
Scottish expatriate sportspeople in the United States
Expatriate soccer players in the United States